Asenaca Ivy Shaw also written as Asenaca Iwy Shaw (born ) was a Fijian female weightlifter, competing in the +75 kg category and representing Fiji at international competitions. She is the twin sister of Fijian weightlifting official Della Shaw Elder.

Shaw was born in Suva, Fiji. She won two bronze medals at the 2007 South Pacific Games in Apia. She won three silvers at the Oceania Weightlifting Championships in Samoa.

She participated at the 2004 Summer Olympics in the +75 kg event.

Major results

References

External links

 

1976 births
Place of birth missing (living people)
Living people
Fijian female weightlifters
Weightlifters at the 2004 Summer Olympics
Olympic weightlifters of Fiji
Weightlifters at the 2006 Commonwealth Games
Commonwealth Games competitors for Fiji